Jason Ainsley (born 30 July 1970) is an English football manager and former player who is currently manager of Spennymoor Town.

Playing career
Ainsley signed for Football League Third Division side Hartlepool United from Spennymoor in June 1994. In October 1994, Ainsley scored his only professional goal for Hartlepool in a 3–1 victory against Preston. After leaving Hartlepool, Ainsley played for several English non-league sides as well as for clubs in Australia and Singapore.

Coaching career
In 2006, Ainsley was appointed as manager of Northern League Division Two (the tenth tier of English football) side Spennymoor. Ainsley was manager of  club Spennymoor Town from 2006 until 2020.
Ainsley was the longest-serving manager in the top seven divisions of English football when he left Spennymoor in 2020. Ainsley won 11 trophies whilst at Spennymoor in more than 770 matches. Ainsley guided Spennymoor to the National League North (6th tier), the highest division in their history. In October 2022, Ainsley returned to Spennymoor Town as manager until the end of the 2022–23 season.

Personal life
Ainsley is also a teacher and head of year at Mortimer Community College.

Honours

Manager
Spennymoor Town
Northern League Division One: 2009–10, 2010–11, 2011–12, 2013–14; runner-up: 2012–13
Northern League Division Two: 2006–07
FA Vase: 2012–13

References

External links
 

1970 births
Living people
Footballers from Stockton-on-Tees
Footballers from County Durham
English footballers
Association football midfielders
Guisborough Town F.C. players
Spennymoor United F.C. players
Bishop Auckland F.C. players
Spennymoor Town F.C. players
Hartlepool United F.C. players
Inglewood United FC players
Blyth Spartans A.F.C. players
Jurong FC players
Gateshead F.C. players
Balestier Khalsa FC players
Barrow A.F.C. players
Durham City A.F.C. players
English Football League players
Singapore Premier League players
English expatriate footballers
English expatriate sportspeople in Australia
Expatriate soccer players in Australia
English expatriate sportspeople in Singapore
Expatriate footballers in Singapore
English football managers
Spennymoor Town F.C. managers
National League (English football) managers